Associazione Sportiva Dilettantistica Casoli Calcio is an Italian association football club located in Casoli, Abruzzo. It currently plays in Promozione.

External links
Official homepage

Football clubs in Abruzzo
Association football clubs established in 1923
1923 establishments in Italy